"Fool in the Rain" is the third song on Led Zeppelin's 1979 album In Through the Out Door. It was the last single released in the US before they formally disbanded in 1980.  The song reached number 21 on the Billboard Hot 100 on 16 February 1980.

Composition
Led Zeppelin bassist John Paul Jones and vocalist Robert Plant were inspired by samba beats that played during the 1978 FIFA World Cup tournament in Argentina. Biographer Dave Lewis commented:

Critical reception
While In Through The Out Door was not regarded with the same praise as Led Zeppelin's previous albums, "Fool in the Rain" still managed to garner positive reception. Scott Ludwig, writing for Courier News in 1980, highly praised Bonham's performance. In a retrospective review, Andrew Doscas of PopMatters called it the "standout track", opining it was "the band’s last fun song" and "the only such found on In Through the Out Door".  Cash Box said it has "a zesty Latin-samba instrumental break, Page's sharp lead and rhythm guitar work and Plant’s high, tough vocals."

Performances
"Fool in the Rain" was never performed live by Led Zeppelin. However, band member Robert Plant teamed up with American rock band Pearl Jam in 2005 and performed the song live for the Hurricane Katrina benefit in Chicago's House of Blues. Pearl Jam originally did not plan it, but changed their itinerary after Hurricane Katrina went through New Orleans. All proceeds of the performance went to charities.

Chart history

See also

References

1979 singles
Led Zeppelin songs
Songs written by Jimmy Page
Songs written by Robert Plant
Songs written by John Paul Jones (musician)
Song recordings produced by Jimmy Page
Swan Song Records singles